The 2022–23 Coupe de France preliminary rounds, Normandy is the qualifying competition to decide which teams from the leagues of the Normandy region of France take part in the main competition from the seventh round.

A total of eight teams will qualify from the Normandy preliminary rounds. 

In 2021–22, all the qualifying teams except Évreux FC 27 were knocked out in the seventh round. Évreux were knocked out in a penalty shootout by ESA Linas-Montlhéry in the eighth round.

Draws and fixtures
On 18 July 2022, the league announced that 392 teams had entered from the region. On the same day, the first round draw was published, with 320 teams from the régional and district divisions involved, and 54 exempted to the second round. The second round draw was published on 23 August 2022.

The third round draw was published on 31 August 2022, and saw the eleven teams from Championnat National 3 enter the competition. The fourth round draw was made live on the leagues Facebook page on 13 September 2022, and saw the three teams from Championnat National 2 enter the competition.

The fifth round draw was made live on the leagues Facebook page on 28 September 2022, and saw the only team in the region from the Championnat National enter the competition. The sixth round draw was also made on the leagues Facebook page, on 11 October 2022.

First round
These matches were played on 19, 20 and 21 August 2022.

Second round
These matches were played on 27 and 28 August 2022.

Third round
These matches were played on 10 and 11 September 2022.

Fourth round
These matches were played on 24 and 25 September 2022.

Fifth round
These matches were played on 8 and 9 October 2022.

Sixth round
These matches were played on 15 and 16 October 2022.

References

Preliminary rounds